Shoal Lake 40 is a First Nations reserve straddling the border of Manitoba and Ontario on the shores of Shoal Lake. It is one of the reserves of the Shoal Lake 40 First Nation.

References

Saulteaux reserves in Ontario
Communities in Kenora District
Indian reserves in Manitoba